Askos may refer to:

 Askos, Sochos, a place in Greece
 Askos (Zakynthos), Greece, a place
 Askos (pottery vessel), a type of ancient Greek pottery vessel

See also
Asko (disambiguation)